Lycée intercommunal Darius Milhaud is a senior high school in Le Kremlin-Bicêtre, France, in the Paris metropolitan area. It serves residents of the communes of Le Kremlin-Bicêtre, Arcueil, Gentilly, and Villejuif, in Val-de-Marne. It is named after the French composer Darius Milhaud.

Lycée Général Darius Milhaud and Lycée Professionnel Erik Satie were a part of a school complex in September 1976. The unified school was established in 1991 from the merger of Milhaud and Satie.

References

Further reading
 "Le lycée rêvé des élèves de Darius-Milhaud." Le Parisien. 3 May 2011.
 "Toute la partition de Darius Milhaud." Arcueil Notre Cité (ANC). May 2012. No. 227. p. 11.

External links
 Lycée intercommunal Darius Milhaud  (Archive)

Lycées in Val-de-Marne
1976 establishments in France
Educational institutions established in 1976
Darius Milhaud